Hasan Askarimay refer to:

 Hasan Askari Rizvi, Pakistani defense analyst
 Hasan Askari (writer), Indian-born Pakistani writer